Krueng Geukueh Station (KRG) is a class III railway station located at Keude Krueng Geukueh, Dewantara, North Aceh Regency. The station, which is located at an altitude of +9 m, is included in the Regional Division I North Sumatra and Aceh.

Services

References

External links

north Aceh Regency
railway stations in Aceh
railway stations opened in 1904
1900s establishments in the Dutch East Indies